Maximilian Rohr (born 27 June 1995) is a German professional footballer who plays as a centre-back for  club SC Paderborn, on loan from Hamburger SV.

Career
Rohr made his professional debut for Carl Zeiss Jena in the 3. Liga on 4 August 2019, starting in the away match against FSV Zwickau. He was sent off in the 82nd minute, with the match finishing as a 2–0 loss.

On 31 August 2022, Rohr joined SC Paderborn on a season-long loan, with an option to buy.

References

External links
 Profile at DFB.de
 Profile at kicker.de

1995 births
Living people
People from Heilbronn (district)
Sportspeople from Stuttgart (region)
Footballers from Baden-Württemberg
German footballers
Association football central defenders
SSV Reutlingen 05 players
FC Carl Zeiss Jena players
Hamburger SV II players
Hamburger SV players
SC Paderborn 07 players
Oberliga (football) players
Regionalliga players
3. Liga players
2. Bundesliga players